Phricanthes is a genus of moths belonging to the family Tortricidae.

Species
Phricanthes argyraetha Diakonoff, 1984
Phricanthes asperana Meyrick, 1881
Phricanthes chalcentes Diakonoff, 1983
Phricanthes diaphorus Common, 1965
Phricanthes eutrachys (Diakonoff, 1948)
Phricanthes flexilineana (Walker, 1863)
Phricanthes hybristis (Meyrick, 1933)
Phricanthes peistica Common, 1965
Phricanthes petulans (Meyrick, 1912)
Phricanthes phaedra (Diakonoff, 1952)

See also
List of Tortricidae genera

References

External links
tortricidae.com

Phricanthini
Tortricidae genera